Shrawan also known as Saaun 
is the fourth month in the Bikram Sambat, the official Nepali calendar. This month coincides with July 17 to August 16 of the Western calendar and is 32 days long.

Months in Nepali calendar

See also
People also fast during the month of Shrawan. It is known as the month of Lord Shiva .The fast can be 'broken' on the Shrawan 15 if you invite people over to your house and feed them delicious Kheer (Rice Pudding) and other vegetable curries (such as Alu Dum, Alu Tama, Paneer) and possibly sukuti. Doing so will instill on you all the blessing of fasting throughout the month while only have fasted for 15 days. Sweet Deal. Women and girls wear bangles (also known as choora) and apply henna (mehendi) on their hands.
Vikram Samvat

Nepali calendar